Cameroon is a country in Central Africa. Cameroon's per-capita GDP (Purchasing power parity) was estimated as US$2,300 in 2008, one of the ten highest in sub-Saharan Africa. Major export markets include France, Italy, South Korea, Spain, and the United Kingdom. Cameroon is aiming to become an emerging country by 2035.

Cameroon has had a decade of strong economic performance, with GDP growing at an average of 4% per year. During the 2004–2008 period, public debt was reduced from over 60% of GDP to 10% and official reserves quadrupled to over USD 3 billion. Cameroon is part of the Bank of Central African States (of which it is the dominant economy), the Customs and Economic Union of Central Africa (UDEAC) and the Organization for the Harmonization of Business Law in Africa (OHADA). Its currency is the CFA franc.

Notable firms 
This list includes notable companies with primary headquarters located in the country. The industry and sector follow the Industry Classification Benchmark taxonomy. Organizations which have ceased operations are included and noted as defunct.

See also
 List of airlines of Cameroon
 List of banks in Cameroon

References 

 
Cameroon